The hymenium is the tissue layer on the hymenophore of a fungal fruiting body where the cells develop into basidia or asci, which produce spores.  In some species all of the cells of the hymenium develop into basidia or asci, while in others some cells develop into sterile cells called cystidia (basidiomycetes) or paraphyses (ascomycetes). Cystidia are often important for microscopic identification.  The subhymenium consists of the supportive hyphae from which the cells of the hymenium grow, beneath which is the hymenophoral trama, the hyphae that make up the mass of the hymenophore.

The position of the hymenium is traditionally the first characteristic used in the classification and identification of mushrooms.  Below are some examples of the diverse types which exist among the macroscopic Basidiomycota and Ascomycota.

 In agarics, the hymenium is on the vertical faces of the gills.
 In boletes and polypores, it is in a spongy mass of downward-pointing tubes.
 In puffballs, it is internal.
 In stinkhorns, it develops internally and then is exposed in the form of a foul-smelling gel.
 In cup fungi, it is on the concave surface of the cup.
 In teeth fungi, it grows on the outside of tooth-like spines.

Gallery

References
Régis Courtecuisse, Bernard Duhem : Guide des champignons de France et d'Europe (Delachaux & Niestlé, 1994–2000).

External links
 IMA Mycological Glossary: Hymenium
 IMA Mycological Glossary: Subhymenium
 APSnet Illustrated Glossary of Plant Pathology: Hymenium Hymenium of an ascomycete, Monilinia fructicola
 Jack Murphy Mycological Images: Hymenium Hymenium of a basidiomycete, Russula laurocerasi

Fungal morphology and anatomy